Shukno Lanka is a 2010 Bengali-language Indian drama film directed by Gaurabh Pandey, starring  Mithun Chakraborty, Debashree Roy and Sabyasachi Chakrabarty.

Premiere

Shukno Lanka is the story of a Junior artist living in a tinsel town, played by Mithun Chakraborty, who is yet to taste success after a struggle of 30 years of acting career. Sabyasachi Chakrabarty plays the character of Joy Sundar Sen, who is inspired by Ritwik Ghatak casts junior artiste Chinu Nandi a chance in the lead role in his next venture.

The film motivates thousands of junior artistes, when the character played by Mithun gets signed for an international project as the leading man.

The film has allusions to the works of Ritwik Ghatak and Satyajit Ray, and even the character played by Sabyasachi Chakrabarty has apparent similarities with Ray.

Plot 
Chinu Nandi (Mithun Chakraborty) was a talented part-time actor and full-time employee of a coal-mine. Once he loses his job, he takes up acting as his full-time job.
However, not starting in the profession early proves to be his demerit. He finds himself as a 250 bucks per day actor, who gets paid only if he gets a chance to play some part on the day. He is cast mainly as elderly house-servants and similar small characters in thoroughly commercial movies. Even so, he tries to give his best in such roles, which makes the stars of such movies (mainly Tublai, played by late Kunal Mitra) insecure, and they start to avoid giving him roles.

Meanwhile, Joy Sundar Sen (Sabyasachi Chakrabarty), a world-renowned director who recently won an award for his movie at the Berlin Film Festival, starts working on his new project: a movie based on Ritwik Ghatak's short story Porosh Pathor (The Philosopher's Stone). In order to portray the protagonist of this movie (Chandrakant), Sen selects Chinu Nandi, much to the dismay of the superstars of the industry, some of whom are openly hostile with Nandi for being 'the chosen one'.

Through the course of filming this movie, we see a lot of these two characters, their sincerity, their devotion to their fields, their love for art, and their talent. When it comes to family, however, Nandi is very happy being a poor simpleton with his wife (Angana Bose), whom he loves very dearly, and cherishes his hobby of cuisine. Sen, on the contrary, is indifferent to his wife (Debashree Roy), who constantly tries to make him feel her presence through her love for him.

The movie, after a couple of obstacles, finally gets released, and everything falls into place. Sen and his wife revive their love for each other, and Nandi wins the respect of his wife and the whole neighborhood.

Cast 
 Mithun Chakraborty as Chinu Nandi.
 Debashree Roy
 Sabyasachi Chakrabarty as Joy Sundar Sen
 Emma Brown Garett
 Angana Bose
 Saheb Chatterjee
 Kunal Mitra
 Biswanath Basu
 Arindam Sil
 Nandini Chaterjee
 Chattrapati Dutta
 Suman De

Chinu Nandi 
In an interview Mithun Chakraborty talked about his character Chinu Nandi– this character gave him an opportunity to retrace his struggling days. He told– ".It has taken me back closer to my roots. But if you look closely, I, Mithun Chakraborty, have not completely outgrown the Chinu Nandy of Shukno Lanka. In a way all of us are bit-role players in the drama of life."

Awards 
Shukno Lanka won Mithun, the Best Actor award in the Critics category of Star Jalsha Awards 2011 for the year 2010.

References

External links
 
 Times of India
 ibnLive

2010 films
2010s Bengali-language films
Bengali-language Indian films
Films set in Kolkata
Films directed by Gaurav Pandey
Indian drama films